Purely Belter is a 2000 British comedy drama film directed by Mark Herman about two teenagers (Chris Beattie and Greg McLane) trying to get money, by any means necessary, in order to get season tickets for home games of Premier League football team Newcastle United.

It is based on the 2000 novel The Season Ticket by Jonathan Tulloch.

Other actors in the film include Roy Hudd, Charlie Hardwick, Tim Healy, Kerry Ann Christiansen and Kevin Whately. There is also a cameo appearance by footballer Alan Shearer, whose car the boys steal.

Title
The title is a Geordie dialect expression. "Pure" simply means very, and "Belter" or "Belta" means great or good. Despite it being based in Newcastle Upon-Tyne and following Newcastle United F.C, the actual dialect phrase "Pure Belter" has been altered to "Purely Belter" to make it grammatically more conventional for a mainstream audience.

The phrase is spoken several times in the film, first by Sewell when he and Gerry go skinny dipping after stealing Shearer's car and later when they dream of the freedom they will have when they get money.

There is an ironic tinge to the film; despite it being all about Newcastle United, the two actors playing Gerry and Sewell are actually from Sunderland and are massive Sunderland A.F.C fans.

Plot
The events take place over a year, the film being divided into four sections named after the four seasons.

Sewell and Gerry, football-mad teenagers from broken families in Gateshead, break into Newcastle United's St James' Park stadium and steal the "sacred" turf from the penalty spot. After this success, they dream of earning money to get season tickets, with aid from their guardian angel, the Angel of the North. For the two tickets they plan to buy, they will need nearly a thousand pounds. After attempts to make money from collecting scrap and baby sitting, they eventually graduate to more criminal activities, including shoplifting and housebreaking. Gerry keeps the money they accumulate in a tin box at home.

Sewell, who lives with his permanently befuddled grandfather (Roy Hudd), adopts a dog who follows him after wandering away from his owner, a local thug. He also dreams of Gemma, a girl who is engaged to Zak, a muscular ice-hockey player for the "Whitley Bay Warriors". At home, Gerry lives with his sickly mother (Charlie Hardwick) and his sister Clare (Tracy Whitwell) who has a baby called "Sheara". They are separated from their violent father Billy (Tim Healy) who has been sexually abusing Gerry's other sister Bridget, who has run away from home. When Billy finds where they live and badly beats Gerry's mother, the family have to move to a secret location. Gerry is bribed by a social worker to attend school for two weeks after which he will get two free football tickets. At the school he is bullied by his teacher (Kevin Whately). Gerry and Sewell attempt to rob his house in revenge, but are nearly caught. When Gerry gets the tickets he is horrified to discover that they are for a Sunderland match. After failing to sell them, the two friends watch the match at the Stadium of Light.

Billy finds the family's new flat and steals all the money Gerry has accumulated. At an empty fairground, Gerry spots his sister Bridget (Kerry Ann Christiansen), who is now a drug addict sleeping rough, but she disappears when he leaves to get some food. After Gemma breaks up with Zak the ice-hockey player, she becomes Sewell's girlfriend. The lads' shoplifting is shown on the TV show Crimestoppers. The thug who originally owned the dog sees the show and spots the animal with Sewell. He finds and attacks him. The seemingly weak and mild-mannered Sewell floors him with a single blow on the neck. At the Newcastle United Training ground at the Riverside pavilion (Chester-le-street), they briefly meet Alan Shearer and ask him to give them season tickets, but he just laughs. They steal a sports car, which turns out to be Shearer's. Looking at his CDs, Sewell is appalled by his musical tastes - (Gabrielle and Celine Dion). Eventually they leave the car and go skinny dipping.

Sewell is delighted when Gemma reveals she is pregnant, but horrified when she goes back to her former fiancé. Sewell attacks him during an ice-hockey match and knocks him out, but is beaten up by his team mates. Gerry's mother becomes ill and is hospitalised. Gerry finds Billy, who ignores his pleas for support. Having lost all their earnings, Sewell and Gerry decide on one last major crime - a bank robbery. The crime goes disastrously wrong and the lads end up under arrest. However, Gerry learns that Billy has been killed in a road accident. The friends are sentenced to 200 hours of community service. One old lady they work for allows them to watch Newcastle play from the balcony of her towerblock, which overlooks the stadium.

Cast
Chris Beattie - Gerry McCarten
Greg McLane - Sewell
Charlie Hardwick - Mrs McCarten
Roy Hudd - Mr Sewell
Tim Healy - Billy McCarten
Kevin Whately - Mr Caird
Tracy Whitwell - Clare McCarten 
Kerry Ann Christiansen - Bridget 
Chris Wiper - Jimmy
Jody Baldwin - Gemma

Critical response
Critic Robert Shail praised the film for its "toughness", saying that it has "enough grit" to depict the characters' lives "without condescension or recourse to easy solutions". In contrast, Jessica Winter in The Rough Guide to Film criticises Herman's fondness for "cloying" close-ups and "contrived melodramatic showdown[s]", saying that the film "probably didn't create many new converts to Herman's partly gritty, party feel-good socialist realist strain of filmmaking."

The Encyclopedia of Sports Films sees the film as a departure from a common depiction of football fans as hooligans, emphasising the positive communal values of the game as "an escape from the violence and despair of their homes". Adrian J. Walsh and Richard Giulianotti point to a "subtext" in the film, linking the poverty and injustice in the lads' lives to the main motivation for the plot, which arises from the fact that "entry prices in what was once the people's game have become so high as to exclude many of the traditional fan base. The film reeks with a sense of basic injustice."

References

External links

2000 films
British association football films
Films based on British novels
Films set in Newcastle upon Tyne
Films produced by Elizabeth Karlsen
Films directed by Mark Herman
Film4 Productions films
2000s English-language films
2000s British films